Clarence Kelly Moore (born September 24, 1982) is a former American football wide receiver who played in the National Football League for three seasons.

High school years
Moore attended Cypress High School in Cypress, California, and lettered in both football and track and field. In track, as a junior triple jump specialist, he won the League Championship and finished third at the State Finals.

Football career
He was selected by the Baltimore Ravens with the 34th pick, in the sixth round of the 2004 NFL Draft out of Northern Arizona University.

On September 1, 2007 the Ravens released him. He is currently a free agent.

Personal life
He currently lives in Avondale, Arizona.

References

1982 births
Living people
American football wide receivers
Baltimore Ravens players
Edmonton Elks players
Northern Arizona Lumberjacks football players
People from Greater Los Angeles